Sir Charlton Leighton, 4th Baronet (c.1747–1784)  was a British politician who sat in the House of Commons between 1774 and 1784.

Leighton was the son of Sir Charlton Leighton, 3rd Baronet and his first wife Anna Maria Mytton, daughter of Richard Mytton of Halston, near Shrewsbury. He was educated at Shrewsbury School and was admitted at St John's College, Cambridge on 17 September 1763 aged 16.

In the 1774 general election Leighton contested Shrewsbury with Robert Clive and was elected as Member of Parliament, but he was unseated on petition in 1775. He succeeded his father in the baronetcy and to Loton Park on 5 May 1780.

At the 1780 general election he was returned unopposed at Shrewsbury and was again returned unopposed there in 1784.

Leighton died unmarried on 9 September 1784 and was succeeded in the baronetcy by his half-brother Robert.

References

Sources

Loton Park

	

1784 deaths
People educated at Shrewsbury School
Alumni of St John's College, Cambridge
British MPs 1774–1780
British MPs 1780–1784
British MPs 1784–1790
Members of the Parliament of Great Britain for English constituencies
Baronets in the Baronetage of England
Year of birth uncertain